Tim McManigal (born December, 1983 in Chicago, IL) is an American football linebacker playing for the Chicago Slaughter of the Indoor Football League. He was signed by the Winnipeg Blue Bombers of the CFL in 2007. He played college football at New Mexico State where he was second team ALL WAC.

Early years
McManigal attended Marist High School in Chicago, IL where he lettered in football and basketball.

External links
 New Mexico State Aggies Bio

1983 births
Living people
Players of American football from Chicago
American football linebackers
New Mexico State Aggies football players
Winnipeg Blue Bombers players